Krage is a surname. Notable people with the surname include:

 Constantin Krage (1900–1984), Danish architect
 Jeremiah Krage (born 1974), British actor
  (1500–1559), German theologian